Commonwealth Party may refer to:

Commonwealth Party (Gibraltar), a defunct political party in Gibraltar
Commonwealth Party (New South Wales), a defunct political party in Australia
Common Wealth Party, a defunct political party in the United Kingdom
Party for the Commonwealth of Canada, a defunct political party in Canada, often referred to as the "Commonwealth Party"